The 1936–37 Panhellenic Championship was the eighth season of the highest football league of Greece. The champions of the 3 founding Associations of the HFF participated in the championship, which were the Αthenian, the Piraeus' and the Macedonian association. Olympiacos won the championship, for the fifth time in its history and for the first time undefeated. The point system was: Win: 2 points - Draw: 1 point - Loss: 0 points.

Qualification round

Athens Football Clubs Association

Piraeus Football Clubs Association

Macedonia Football Clubs Association

Final round

League table

Top scorers

External links
Rsssf 1936–37 championship

Panhellenic Championship seasons
Greece
1936–37 in Greek football